The 1943 All-Southwest Conference football team consists of American football players chosen by various organizations for All-Southwest Conference teams for the 1943 college football season.  The selectors for the 1943 season included the Associated Press (AP) and the United Press (UP).

All Southwest selections

Backs
 J. R. Callahan, Texas (AP-1)
 Jim Hallmark, Texas A&M (AP-1)
 Ralph Ellsworth, Texas (AP-1)
 Joe Magliolo, Texas (AP-1)

Ends
 Joe Parker, Texas (AP-1)
 Abe Croft, Southern Methodist (AP-1)

Tackles
 Charles Malmberg, Rice (AP-1)
 Clyde Flowers, Texas Christian (AP-1)

Guards
 Leon Pense, Arkansas (AP-1)
 Goble Bryant, Texas A&M (AP-1)

Centers
 Billy Hale, Texas Christian (AP-1)

Key
AP = Associated Press

UP = United Press

Bold = Consensus first-team selection of both the AP and UP

See also
1943 College Football All-America Team

References

All-Southwest Conference
All-Southwest Conference football teams